Panchito Pistoles is a cartoon anthropomorphic rooster created by Fred Moore. He first appeared in the 1944 Disney film The Three Caballeros with his friends Donald Duck and José Carioca. He later appeared in several Disney comics, including a year-long run in the Silly Symphony Sunday comic strip (1944–1945) as well as Don Rosa's comic book stories The Three Caballeros Ride Again (2000) and The Magnificent Seven (Minus 4) Caballeros (2005). He speaks Spanish with a Mexican accent.

Description
Panchito is a friend of Donald Duck and José Carioca. He lives in Mexico and rides on a horse called Señor Martinez. He had some appearances in Disney's House of Mouse and in Minnie's Bow-Toons as a MC for a Mexican Fiesta. His first appearance in comics was a self-titled 1943 story in which he met and fell for Clara Cluck. A few months earlier he appeared in a text story titled "La Piñata".

From 1944, Panchito headlined a year-long sequence in the Silly Symphony Sunday comic strip, written by Bill Walsh, with pencils by Paul Murry and inks by Dick Moores.

Panchito's full name is Panchito Romero Miguel Junipero Francisco Quintero González III. Panchito is a nickname for Francisco, which is also his fifth name. The unusually long name is a joking reference to the fact that, in many Spanish speaking countries, people use two surnames (which in some cases are composed of two or more words) and commonly have one or more middle names. This can sometimes result in very long names (for example, Juan Nepomuceno Carlos Pérez-Rulfo Vizcaíno; María del Rosario Mercedes Laura Jennifer Pilar Martínez Molina Baeza). Quintero González is Panchito's last name; according to Spanish naming practices, Quintero would be his father's last name and González his mother's. This full name was mostly maintained in Legend of the Three Caballeros, only dropping Junipero from his name.

As there is no reference to his surname "Pistoles", some people assume that it is another nickname. The word "Pistoles" does not exist in Spanish, although "Pistolas" would mean guns, specifically handguns or pistols. As a matter of fact, the character is known as "Panchito Pistolas" in the Spanish market.

Señor Martinez
Señor Martinez is the anthropomorphic horse of Panchito Pistoles. Señor Martinez first appeared in a 1944 newspaper strip, written by Bill Walsh and drawn by Paul Murry. Recently the horse made appearances in "The Three Caballeros Ride Again" and "The Magnificent Seven (Minus Four) Caballeros", both stories written and drawn by Don Rosa. However, Don Rosa chose to draw Señor Martinez as a 'realistic' horse, instead of sticking with his more cartoonish original appearance.

Disney theme parks appearances
The merchandise location at Disney's Coronado Springs Resort at Walt Disney World is named Panchito's Gifts and Sundries, and features Panchito's likeness on its sign.

In April 2007, Walt Disney World re-introduced Panchito (along with the second Caballero, José Carioca), in the newly revamped ride at Epcot's Mexico Pavilion with entirely new animation and a new storyline.  It has been dubbed "The Gran Fiesta Tour".  In the storyline, the reunited Three Caballeros are set to play a show in Mexico City. Donald Duck goes missing, and José and Panchito must search throughout Mexico for Donald as he takes in various sights around Mexico. The animation was apparently directed by Eric Goldberg.

Panchito can also be seen in the Hong Kong Disneyland version of It's a Small World, which opened on April 28, 2008, as well as the Disneyland (in California) version of It's a Small World, installed during major refurbishments between January and November 2008, also as the Tokyo Disneyland version of It's a Small World, installed during major refurbishments between March 2017 and April 2018.

José and Panchito's costumes were extinct at the Disneyland Resort by 2011, but were re-Imagineered for Mickey's Soundsational Parade. They now appear daily with Donald Duck and dancers with a float where Donald is trying to hit a Pinata.

In late 2012, Panchito appears with José and Donald in Disney California Adventure's ¡Viva Navidad! celebration for the holiday seasons.

Aircraft representations

During World War II, the Mexican Escuadrón 201 used Panchito Pistoles as its mascot.

The U.S. Army Air Force operated a North American Aviation B-25J Mitchell, serial number 43-28147, which was named and decorated with the likeness of Panchito as her nose art. She operated with the 41st Bombardment Group in the Central Pacific theater from December 1943 to October 1944 and was eventually scrapped in 1949.

Also the Swedish Air force had a P51 decorated with Panchito. The P51 was called J26 in Sweden and this air craft, "Röd Erik" (Red Erik), belonged to the 3rd division at the 16th wing outside Uppsala. The decoration was painted 1946 by Sture Mattsson.

Today, another B-25J Mitchell, serial number 44-30734, flies as a replica of the original Panchito. Delivered in February 1945, she operated with the U.S. Army Air Force until being sold into civilian service in 1959. Restored in 1986, today she flies with the Rag Wings and Radials airshow performers.

In other media
 Panchito made two guest appearances in Disney's House of Mouse, voiced by Carlos Alazraqui. He and José appear in the episodes "The Three Caballeros" and "Not So Goofy".
 Panchito appears alongside José in the Mickey and the Roadster Racers episodes "Mickey's Perfector Day!" and "Super-Charged: Daisy's Grande Goal", reprised by Carlos Alazraqui.
 Panchito and the Three Caballeros make an appearance in the Mickey Mouse episode "¡Feliz Cumpleaños!" as performers at Mickey's birthday.
 Panchito appears as one of the main characters in the Legend of the Three Caballeros animated series. He is voiced by Jaime Camil. For this incarnation, he does not use pistols and is credited as "Panchito Gonzalez".
 Panchito appears alongside the other Caballeros in the 2017 DuckTales series, voiced by Arturo Del Puerto. He appears in the episode "The Town Where Everyone Was Nice!", which explains that he, José and Donald performed in a band called "The Three Caballeros" in college, reuniting years later as adults. He returned in the third-season episode, "Louie's Eleven!" to increase the Caballeros' popularity, and makes a cameo in the series finale, "The Last Adventure!"

References

Further reading
 "How Disney Combines Living Actors with His Cartoon Characters", Popular Science, Sept 1944.

External links

Anthropomorphic birds
Disney comics characters
Disney core universe characters
Film characters introduced in 1944
Comics characters introduced in 1944
Fictional chickens
Male characters in animation
Male characters in comics
Fictional Mexican people
Western (genre) comics characters
Disney comic strips